Louis-Michel van Loo (2 March 1707, Toulon – 20 March 1771, Paris) was a French painter.

Biography
He studied under his father, the painter Jean-Baptiste van Loo, at Turin and Rome, and he won a prize at the Académie Royale de Peinture et de Sculpture in Paris in 1725. With his uncle, the painter Charles-André van Loo, he went to Rome in 1727–1732, and in 1736 he became court painter to Philip V of Spain at Madrid, where he was a founder-member of the Royal Academy of Fine Arts of San Fernando in 1752.

He returned to Paris in 1753, and painted many portraits of Louis XV of France. In 1765 he succeeded Charles-André as director of the special school of the French academy known as the École Royale des Élèves Protégés.
In 1766 he made the portrait of the Portuguese statesman Sebastião de Melo, Marquis of Pombal.

Among his brothers were the painters François van Loo (1708–1732) and Charles-Amédée-Philippe van Loo (1719–1795).

Selected works

References

External links

1707 births
1771 deaths
18th-century French painters
French male painters
French portrait painters
Rococo painters
Court painters
18th-century French male artists